Mazar (also Romanized as Mazārʿ; also known as Mazrā‘, Mazrā‘-e Darreh Shūr, Mazra‘eh, and Mirza) is a village in Khorram Dasht Rural District, Kamareh District, Khomeyn County, Markazi Province, Iran. At the 2006 census, its population was 35, in 9 families.

References 

Populated places in Khomeyn County